The Ladies Diplomat is a 1932 German comedy film directed by E. W. Emo and starring Mártha Eggerth, Max Hansen, and Leo Slezak. It was remade in Britain in 1934 as The Diplomatic Lover.

Synopsis
When a womanising military attaché arrives in Berlin he becomes entangled with a down-to-earth chorus girl Hella.

Cast

References

External links

1932 comedy films
German comedy films
Films of the Weimar Republic
Films directed by E. W. Emo
German black-and-white films
Films set in Berlin
1930s German films